Sarvagna Murthy is a 1965 Indian Kannada-language film, directed by Aruru Pattabhi and produced by M. Narendra Babu. The film stars Rajkumar, Harini, Udaykumar and Mynavathi. The film has musical score by G. K. Venkatesh. The movie chronicles the life of Kannada poet - philosopher Sarvajna.

Cast

Rajkumar
Harini
Udaykumar
Mynavathi
K. S. Ashwath
Rajamma Gokak
Niranjan
T. N. Balakrishna
Jayalakshmi
Varadaraj
Dikki Madhava Rao
Mysore Lakshmi
H. Krishna Shastry
M. A. Ganapathi Bhat
B. Hanumanthachar
H. R. Hanumantha Rao
Ambujamma
H. P. Saroja
Padmamma
Soorya Kumar
E. V. Saroja

Soundtrack

References

External links
 

1960s Kannada-language films
Films scored by G. K. Venkatesh